Thermococcus stetteri is an extremely thermophilic, marine, sulfur-metabolizing archaebacterium. It is anaerobic, its cells being irregular cocci 1 to 2 μm in diameter. Of the strains first isolated, two were motile due to a tuft of flagella, while the other two strains were nonmotile. Its type strain is K-3 (DSM 5262). It can grow  on starch, pectin, and peptides, but not amino acids.

References

Further reading

External links

LPSN
WORMS
Type strain of Thermococcus stetteri at BacDive -  the Bacterial Diversity Metadatabase

Euryarchaeota
Archaea described in 1990